Akina Mama wa Afrika (AMwA) (Swahili for "African women") was established in 1985 in the United Kingdom as a small community organisation for African women. It is now an international and Pan-African non-governmental organisation headquartered in Kampala, Uganda.

Service 
AMwA is described as a "training centre" and "advocacy engine" for the women's movement in Africa. It focuses on enhancing women's ability to participate in leadership through education programs, resource and research, providing platforms for advocacy and movements to influence politics and legislation.

In 2014, AMwA, with other women's organisations, conducted a regional conference in Kampala on the theme "Strengthening African Women’s Voices in the Post-2015 Processes". The conference intended to serve as a reminder of the common issues African women continue to face, including gender-based violence.

Some of the organisations that have helped support Akina Mama wa Afrika include the African Women's Development Fund and the Sigrid Rausing Trust.

The African Women’s Leadership Institute (AWLI) 
The AWLI, established first in 1996, focus on themes such as gender-based violence, Sexual and Reproductive Health and Rights, anti-poverty efforts and peace building. It is designed by women leaders from Africa, for providing professional support, networking opportunities and workshops to women activists aged 18–45 from across the continent.

See also
Christine Butegwa

References

External links
Official website
1985 establishments in the United Kingdom
Feminist organisations in Uganda
Organizations established in 1985
Progressive International
Women's organisations based in Uganda
Women's rights in Uganda